Hamamat Montia (22. July 1988) is a Ghanaian model and a former Miss Malaika queen.

Career 
Starting as a model, she was elected Miss Malaika in 2006 and model of Africa Universe in 2007. She sells shea butter, soap and other products handmade in Ghana.

Personal life 
She hails from Bolgatanga in the Upper East region of Ghana, and got her high school education at Achimota School.
She is aged 34 (2022)
She is a mother of two daughters and one son.

References

External links
Hamamat.com

Ghanaian female models
Living people
People from Upper East Region
Alumni of Achimota School
Ghanaian beauty pageant winners
1988 births